James Leslie White (9 September 1890 – 27 April 1927) was an Australian rules footballer who played for Essendon and St Kilda in the Victorian Football League (VFL).

White, from the Hawthorn Rovers originally, was predominantly a defender but could also play as a centreman. Injury caused him to miss Essendon's 1911 premiership but he was on a halfback flank when they claimed back-to-back premierships the following season.

He died of pneumonia on 27 April 1927, aged 36.

References

Holmesby, Russell and Main, Jim (2007). The Encyclopedia of AFL Footballers. 7th ed. Melbourne: Bas Publishing.
Essendon Football Club profile

1890 births
1927 deaths
Australian rules footballers from Melbourne
Essendon Football Club players
Essendon Football Club Premiership players
St Kilda Football Club players
Deaths from pneumonia in Victoria (Australia)
Australian military personnel of World War I
One-time VFL/AFL Premiership players
People from Hawthorn, Victoria
Military personnel from Melbourne